The International Convention for the Suppression of the Traffic in Women and Children is a 1921 multilateral treaty of the League of Nations that addressed the problem of international trafficking of women and children.

Background
The growth of the social reform movement during the late 19th century gave momentum to international efforts by women's rights groups, social hygiene activists, and others, to address trafficking in women and children and its role in prostitution and labour exploitation. Previous international conventions had been ratified by 34 countries in 1901 and 1904, and 1910 as "Convention for Suppression of White Slave Trade". The League of Nations, formed in 1919, quickly became the organization coordinating international efforts to study and attempt to end the practice. The work of the League in this area is considered to be one of its successes while overall it was a failure due to its inability to prevent war. The work of the League in this area was a central part of Evelyn Waugh's 1928 novel Decline and Fall.

League of Nations
When it was established, the League of Nations at first did not include women's rights groups, who protested their exclusion and canvassed politicians for support. Ultimately, United States President Woodrow Wilson and France's Prime Minister Georges Clemenceau supported the participation of women's rights groups, who they argued were best suited to give a voice to women's issues. The League held the International Conference on White Slave Traffic in 1921, and agreed on the 1921 International Convention for the Suppression of the Traffic in Women and Children on 30 September 1921.

In 1933, it passed the International Convention for the Suppression of the Traffic in Women of Full Age.

Key contents
The 1921 Convention ensure that protection from trafficking and sexual exploitation on the international level. The Article 6 states that "The High Contracting Parties agree, in case they have not already taken licensing and supervision of employment agencies and offices, to prescribe such regulations as are required to ensure the protection of women and children seeking employment in another country." and the Article 7 to "undertake in connection with immigration and emigration adopt such administrative and legislative measures as are required to check the traffic in women and children. In particular, they undertake to make such regulations as are required for the protection of women and children travelling on emigrant ships, not only at the points of departure and arrival, but also during the journey and to arrange for the exhibition, in railway stations and imports of notices warning women and children of the traffic and indicating the places where they can obtain accommodation and assistance."

Impact
The 1921 Convention set new goals for international efforts to stem human trafficking, primarily by giving the anti-trafficking movement further official recognition, as well as a bureaucratic apparatus to research and fight the problem. The Advisory Committee on the Traffic of Women and Children was a permanent advisory committee of the League. Its members were nine countries, and several non-governmental organizations. An important development was the implementation of a system of annual reports of member countries. Member countries formed their own centralized offices to track and report on trafficking of women and children.

The advisory committee also worked to expand its research and intervention program beyond the United States and Europe. In 1929, a need to expand into the Near East (Asia Minor), the Middle East, and Asia were acknowledged. An international conference of central authorities in Asia was planned for 1937, but no further action was taken during the late 1930s.

Reservations
To this 1921 Convention, some nations declare reservations; inter alia, Australia, British Empire, Japan, Spain and New Zealand reserve the application to the colonies, protectorate and mandated territories; India, Japan and Thailand reserve the Article 5 on limitation of age under 21 years old.

Subsequent international law
The League of Nations disbanded with World War II, and was succeeded by the United Nations. The 1921 Convention thereby was replaced by the 1947 Protocol to amend the 1921 Convention for the Suppression of the Traffic in Women and Children, legislation tabled by the United Nations Secretary General on 12 November 1947. The 1947 Protocol was ultimately ratified by 46 countries. This Protocol was superseded by the Convention for the Suppression of the Traffic in Persons and of the Exploitation of the Prostitution of Others (1949) whose Preamble recalls the 1921 Convention together with "1910 Convention for Suppression of White Slave Traffic", and "1933 Convention on the Suppression of Traffic of Women of Full Age", again tabled by the United Nations Secretary-General.

See also
Human trafficking
Child prostitution
League of Nations
Reform movement
Prostitution law
Social hygiene
Sexual slavery
Arab slave trade
Karayuki-san
Comfort women
Slave Trade Acts
German military brothels in World War II
Convention for the Suppression of the Traffic in Persons and of the Exploitation of the Prostitution of Others
United States House of Representatives House Resolution 121

References

Further reading

External links
Ratifications of 1921 treaty.
Signatures and ratifications of amended treaty.

Human trafficking treaties
League of Nations treaties
Treaties concluded in 1921
Treaties entered into force in 1922
Treaties of the Kingdom of Afghanistan
Treaties of the Principality of Albania
Treaties of Algeria
Treaties extended to Australia
Treaties of the First Austrian Republic
Treaties of Belgium
Treaties of Vargas-era Brazil
Treaties extended to Canada
Treaties of the Republic of China (1912–1949)
Treaties of Cuba
Treaties of the Czech Republic
Treaties of Czechoslovakia
Treaties of Denmark
Treaties of the Kingdom of Egypt
Treaties of Finland
Treaties of the Weimar Republic
Treaties of the Kingdom of Greece
Treaties of the Kingdom of Hungary (1920–1946)
Treaties extended to British India
Treaties of the Irish Free State
Treaties of the Kingdom of Italy (1861–1946)
Treaties of Jamaica
Treaties of the Kingdom of Libya
Treaties of Luxembourg
Treaties of Madagascar
Treaties of Malawi
Treaties of Malta
Treaties of Mexico
Treaties of Montenegro
Treaties of Myanmar
Treaties of the Netherlands
Treaties of Nicaragua
Treaties of Norway
Treaties of the Dominion of Pakistan
Treaties of the Philippines
Treaties of the Second Polish Republic
Treaties of the Kingdom of Romania
Treaties of the Soviet Union
Treaties of Serbia and Montenegro
Treaties of Sierra Leone
Treaties of Singapore
Treaties of Slovakia
Treaties of Sweden
Treaties extended to the French Mandate for Syria and the Lebanon
Treaties of Turkey
Treaties of the Kingdom of Yugoslavia
Treaties of the Bahamas
Treaties of Cyprus
Treaties of the Byelorussian Soviet Socialist Republic
Treaties of Fiji
Treaties of Ghana
Treaties of Mauritius
Treaties of North Macedonia
Treaties of Trinidad and Tobago
Treaties of Zambia
Treaties of Zimbabwe
1921 in Switzerland
Treaties extended to the British Leeward Islands
Treaties extended to the British Windward Islands
Treaties extended to British Honduras
Treaties extended to British Ceylon
Treaties extended to British Cyprus
Treaties extended to Gibraltar
Treaties extended to British Hong Kong
Treaties extended to British Kenya
Treaties extended to the Crown Colony of Malta
Treaties extended to Northern Rhodesia
Treaties extended to Nyasaland
Treaties extended to the Crown Colony of Seychelles
Treaties extended to Southern Rhodesia
Treaties extended to the Straits Settlements
Treaties extended to the Crown Colony of Trinidad and Tobago
Treaties extended to British Guiana
Treaties extended to the Colony of Fiji
Treaties extended to the Colony of Jamaica
Treaties extended to British Mauritius
Treaties extended to British Dominica
Treaties extended to the Gold Coast (British colony)
Treaties extended to the Colony of Sierra Leone
Treaties extended to the Gambia Colony and Protectorate
Treaties extended to Tanganyika (territory)
Treaties extended to the Uganda Protectorate
Treaties extended to the British Solomon Islands
Treaties extended to the Gilbert and Ellice Islands
Treaties extended to Mandatory Palestine
Treaties extended to the Emirate of Transjordan
Treaties extended to the Colony of Sarawak
Treaties extended to the Sultanate of Zanzibar
Treaties extended to British Burma
Treaties extended to the Nauru Trust Territory
Treaties extended to New Zealand
Treaties extended to the Union of South Africa
Treaties extended to the Faroe Islands
Treaties extended to Italian Somaliland
Treaties extended to Italian Libya
Treaties extended to the Italian Islands of the Aegean
Treaties extended to the Dutch East Indies
Treaties extended to Curaçao and Dependencies
Treaties extended to Surinam (Dutch colony)
Treaties extended to Portuguese Macau
Treaties extended to the Territory of New Guinea
Treaties extended to the Territory of Papua
Treaties extended to Norfolk Island
Treaties extended to West Berlin
Anti-slavery treaties